Neusticurus racenisi, known commonly as Roze's neusticurus or the common Venezuelan water teiid, is a species of lizard in the family Gymnophthalmidae. The species is endemic to northern South America.

Etymology
The specific name, racenisi, is in honor of Latvian-born Venezuelan entomologist Janis Racenis (1915–1980).

Geographic range
N. racenisi is found in northern Brazil and adjacent Venezuela.

Habitat

Reproduction
N. racenisi is oviparous.

References

Further reading
Ribeiro-Júnior MA, Amaral S (2017). "Catalogue of distribution of lizards (Reptilia: Squamata) from Brazilian Amazonia. IV. Alopoglossidae, Gymnophthalmidae". Zootaxa 4269 (2): 151–196.
Rivas GA, Molina CR, Ugueto GN, Barros TR, Barrio-Amorós CL, Kok PJR (2012). "Reptiles of Venezuela: an updated and commented checklist". Zootaxa 3211: 1-64.
Roze J (1958). Resultados zoologicos de la expedicion de la Universidad Central de Venezuela a la region del Auyantepui en la Guayana Venezolana, Abril de 1956. 5. Los reptiles de Auyantepui, Venezuela, basendose en las colecciones de las expediciones de Phelps-Tate ". Acta Biologica Venezuelica 2: 243–270. (Neusticurus racenisi, new species, p. 2520. (in Spanish).

Neusticurus
Reptiles of Brazil
Reptiles of Venezuela
Reptiles described in 1958
Taxa named by Janis Roze